The 1963 UMass Redmen football team represented the University of Massachusetts Amherst in the 1963 NCAA College Division football season as a member of the Yankee Conference. The team was coached by Vic Fusia and played its home games at Alumni Field in Amherst, Massachusetts. The Redmen defense was stifling all year long, as they surrendered only one touchdown through the entire season. Outscoring their opponents 265–12, UMass finished undefeated for the third in team history and the most recent time to date. The one imperfection on the team's record was a 0–0 tie on the road against in-state rival Harvard. UMass finished the season with a record of 8–0–1 overall and 5–0 in conference play.

Schedule

References

UMass
UMass Minutemen football seasons
Yankee Conference football champion seasons
College football undefeated seasons
UMass Redmen football